Michael Edward Bragg (born September 26, 1946) is a former American football punter in the National Football League for the Washington Redskins and Baltimore Colts.  He played college football at the University of Richmond and was drafted in the fifth round of the 1968 NFL Draft.

Bragg was the last active NFL player to play for Vince Lombardi, who coached the Redskins in 1969 before succumbing to colon cancer on September 3, 1970.

References

1946 births
Living people
Players of American football from Richmond, Virginia
American football punters
Richmond Spiders football players
Washington Redskins players
Baltimore Colts players